The Chaedong Line is an electrified railway line of the Korean State Railway in South P'yŏngan Province, North Korea, running from Kujŏng on the P'yŏngdŏk Line to Chaedong.

History
The Chaedong Line was opened by the West Chosen Central Railway on 1 October 1941, at the same time as the railway's Sinsŏngch'ŏn–Pukch'ang line.

Route 
A yellow background in the "Distance" box indicates that section of the line is not electrified.

References

Railway lines in North Korea
Standard gauge railways in North Korea
Railway lines opened in 1941